Gulu railway station is a station in Tibet Autonomous Region, People's Republic of China, on the Qingzang Railway.

See also
 Qingzang Railway
 List of stations on Qingzang railway

Railway stations in Tibet
Stations on the Qinghai–Tibet Railway